Sonia Alconini Mujica (born 1965) is a Bolivian anthropologist and archaeologist specializing in the socioeconomic and political development of early states and empires in the Andes. She has studied the dynamics of ancient imperial frontiers, and the ways in which Guarani tropical tribes expanded over these spaces. She has also conducted work in the eastern Bolivian valleys and Lake Titicaca region.

Biography
Sonia Alconini Mujica was born 1965 in Bolivia and developed an early interest in the political formations of early Andean societies and the use of archaeology to improve the understanding of cultural relationships. 
In 1992, she participated in the Taraco Archaeological Project of UC Berkeley at Chiripa, an ongoing project aimed at unraveling the socioeconomic and political development of the Formative Period of the Lake Titicaca basin. Pottery shards excavated at the site were from Chiripa, Chiripa-Mamani, and Tiwanaku III, IV, and V phases of civilization.
She completed her undergraduate degree in 1993 from the Universidad Mayor de San Andrés in La Paz and went on to study at the University of Pittsburgh, earning a master's degree in anthropology in 2000 and a PhD in archaeology in 2002. In 2004, Alconini was hired as an assistant professor at the University of Texas at San Antonio and in 2010, she was promoted to an associate professor in the Department of Anthropology.

Her early research focused on the spread of the Inka into the Bolivian highlands and their impact on the civilizations already in the area, showing interaction between cultures rather than domination. She won a US National Science Foundation grant in 2007 to further explore the boundaries of the Inka expansion and clarify changes before and after Inka contact. The aim of the project was to determine how contact with the Inka effected settlement patterns and the political economy of the area. In 2009, Alconini's excavations in the Charazani valley, the ancient imperial center of the Kallawayas, at a site called Pata Kaata yielded new insights into the evolution of the area, the range of activities which took place in its sacred sites, the process used to maintain political legitimacy and the hierarchy of the cultures at the borders of Lake Titicaca. In 2013, her collaboration with Sara Becker of the University of California at Riverside at the Wata Wata site, uncovered three skulls, two belonging to women. Examination showed ritual acts of violence, including beheading and removal of the eyes with no sign of battle injury. The discovery scuttled a long-held belief that images of violence were not literal depictions but were illustrative. Alconini's assessment of the evidence concluded that the inhabitants of Tiwanaku empire in the Kallawaya region of Bolivia, used trade, religion, and ritual violence as political strategies to retain power.

Selected works

References

Bibliography

1965 births
Living people
Bolivian women scientists
Bolivian archaeologists
20th-century Bolivian women writers
20th-century women scientists
21st-century women scientists
Bolivian women archaeologists
21st-century Bolivian women writers